Cipinang Penitentiary Institution is a top-security prison in Jakarta, Indonesia. It is exactly located in Cipinang Muara, Jatinegara, East Jakarta.

History
The prison was built by the Dutch colonial administration, during the Indonesian National Revival. It held Indonesian nationalist leaders such as Mohammed Hatta. Following Indonesian independence, novelist Pramoedya A. Toer was arrested in 1961 and held without trial for nearly a year in Cipinang for criticizing the Sukarno administration's anti-Chinese policies.

Human rights groups such as Amnesty International and Human Rights Watch alleged that the Suharto administration used Cipinang and other prisons to silence opponents from the Sukarno administration and Irian Jaya.
In their annual report for 2005, AI also spoke of routine torture and ill-treatment.  The organization said of Cipinang and other prisons: 
According to a survey conducted by a local non-governmental organization, over 81 per cent of prisoners arrested between January 2003 and April 2005 in Salemba detention centre, Cipinang prison and Pondok Bambu prison, all in Jakarta, were tortured or ill-treated. About 64 per cent were tortured or ill-treated during interrogation, 43 per cent during arrest and 25 per cent during detention.

During the Indonesian occupation of East Timor, East Timorese independence activists, such as Xanana Gusmão (later President of East Timor), were housed in the jail. Others imprisoned at Cipinang for political activity include political dissidents Asep Suryaman, Sri Bintang Pamungkas, and labor leader Muchtar Pakpahan. After Suharto's resignation in 1998, new President Jusuf Habibie released Pamungkas, Pakpahan, and Gusmão.

Abu Bakar Bashir, the spiritual leader of Islamist terrorist group, Jemaah Islamiyah, was imprisoned in Cipinang. He was released after serving 26 months for conspiracy relating to the 2002 Bali bombing.

Today
The jail holds 4,000 prisoners in a facility designed to hold 1,500. Well-connected prisoners are often able to obtain superior accommodation.  The former governor of Jakarta, Ahok, was imprisoned here, but was released in January 2019 after receiving a two-month remission.

See also
 Political prisoner

References

External links
 
"The view from Cipinang prison" Green Left Weekly

Buildings and structures in Jakarta
Prisons in Indonesia
Politics of Indonesia